The Wineland blue (Lepidochrysops bacchus) is a species of butterfly in the family Lycaenidae. It is endemic to South Africa, where it is found from the Western Cape to the Eastern Cape.

The wingspan is 22–29 mm for males and 24–30 mm for females. Adults are on wing from September to January. There is one generation per year.

The larvae feed on Selago fruticosa and Selago geniculata.

References

Butterflies described in 1938
Lepidochrysops
Endemic butterflies of South Africa
Taxonomy articles created by Polbot